A handhold is a manner the dancers hold each other's hands during the dance. 
A hold is the way one partner holds another one with hands.
Hold and handhold are important components of connection in dance.

Couple dances
Waist-hand hold
Shoulder-waist hold
Shoulder blade hold
Ballroom hold
Banjo hold
Barn dance hold 
Butterfly hold: in face-to-face dance position, the arms are extended sideways palm to palm, elbows slightly bent 
Shoulder hold (varsouvienne hold)
Cross-back hold
Promenade hold
Short-arm hold
Skaters hold
Back skaters hold: partners side-by-side, same hands joined, man right arm around lady's waist with right hands on the lady's right hip, left hands joined in front, man's hand palm up 
Front skaters hold
V hold
Hammerlock hold
Sweetheart hold
Cuddle hold

Line/circle dances
When danced in line or circle formation, the handholds usually connect a dancer with the two immediate neighbors, sometimes with the two second next neighbors. Exceptions are free hands of the first and last persons in the line formation. 

A number of these holds may be used in couple dances (a couple is a line of just two).

Shoulder hold
Chain hold
Basket hold 
Front basket hold: Arms are extended sideways in front of the neighbors to connect with the arms of the second next person
Back basket hold: Arms are extended sideways behind the neighbors to connect with the arms of the second next person
Belt hold: Each dancer holds the belts of the neighbors
Escort hold: one arm slightly rounded with arm at waist level, the neighbor from this side place the opposite hand on the forearm through the space formed by founded arm

References

Dance technique